The Hodgkins Medal is awarded annually or biennially by the Smithsonian Institution for important contributions to the understanding of the physical environment as it affects the welfare of man. 

It was established in 1893 in honor of Thomas George Hodgkins, who left his fortune to the Smithsonian,  stipulating that a portion be used to promote atmospheric research.

Recipients
Recipients include:
1980 - Luigi Giuseppe Jacchia
1978 - Alexander Dalgarno
1976 – E. Cuyler Hammond
1973 – Walter Orr Roberts
1971 – Lewis Mumford
1969 – Arie Jan Haagen-Smit, Jule Gregory Charney
1967 – Frits W. Went, John Grahame Douglas Clark
1965 – Joseph Kaplan, Marcel Nicolet, Sydney Chapman
1902 – Joseph John Thomson
1899 – James Dewar

See also

 List of environmental awards

References 

Environmental awards
Awards established in 1893
American science and technology awards
1893 establishments in the United States
Smithsonian Institution